Hugh Wiley (May 21, 1927 – September 3, 1999) was an American equestrian. He competed at the 1956 Summer Olympics and the 1960 Summer Olympics.

References

External links
 

1927 births
1999 deaths
American male equestrians
Olympic equestrians of the United States
Equestrians at the 1956 Summer Olympics
Equestrians at the 1960 Summer Olympics
Pan American Games medalists in equestrian
Pan American Games gold medalists for the United States
Equestrians at the 1959 Pan American Games
Sportspeople from New Haven, Connecticut
Medalists at the 1959 Pan American Games